The men's 50 metre rifle, prone was a shooting sports event held as part of the Shooting at the 1952 Summer Olympics programme. It was the seventh appearance of the event. The competition was held on 29 July 1952 at the shooting ranges in Helsinki. 58 shooters from 32 nations competed.

Medalists

Results

References

Shooting at the 1952 Summer Olympics
Men's 050m prone 1952